Khosta may refer to the following objects in Sochi:
Khosta Microdistrict
Khosta railway station
Khosta River
2S34 Khosta, a variant of the 2S1 Gvozdika